The Litchfield Council is a local government area of the Northern Territory of Australia on the eastern and southeastern outskirts of the Darwin-Palmerston urban area.

Geography

The Litchfield Municipality is bounded by the Adelaide River to the east, Van Diemen Gulf and the Coomalie Shire in the south and the City of Darwin and City of Palmerston to the northwest. The Stuart and Arnhem Highways run through the Litchfield Municipality. Most of the Municipality is rural or rural-residential in character.

Current day service provision
Despite the first elected body's original ethos of the 3Rs in the early 1980s, Litchfield Council went on, and continues, to provide numerous services beyond Roads, Rubbish and Recreation, including but not limited to;

 Animal Management 
 Abandoned Vehicles 
 Planning and Development
 Thorak Regional Cemetery (from 1 July 2008)
 Street Lights (from 1 January 2018) 
 Waste and Recycling
 Taminmin Library 
 Recreation Reserves 
 Weed and Roadside Management

These services are available to be used by all residents and visitors to the municipality in carrying out their daily activities.

In addition to its services, Litchfield Council has adopted a Tourism and Events Strategy 2021-2024 https://litchfield.nt.gov.au/system/files/uploads/files/2020/Litchfield%20Council%20Tourism%20and%20Events%20Strategy%20-%20FINAL.pdf and, in its Municipal Plan 2021-22, committed to develop a youth strategy and action plan https://litchfield.nt.gov.au/system/files/uploads/files/2021/Litchfield%20Municipal%20Plan%202021-22-online.pdf

History
The original inhabitants of the Litchfield area were the Larrakia, Wulna (or Djerimanga) and Djowei Aboriginal people. The arrival of European settlers dates from 1864. Litchfield is named after Frederick Henry Litchfield who with William Patrick Auld was a member of an early survey and settlement party and who explored areas of the Northern Territory from Escape Cliffs in Van Diemen Gulf to the Daly River. Some growth took place during the 1870s and 1880s, after the construction of the Overland Telegraph Line. There was more substantial growth during the post-war years, especially during the 1970s.

The Litchfield Shire was proclaimed by an Act of the NT Parliament on 6 September 1985. On 7 December 1985 an election was held to elect the first Council composed of a Shire President and four Councillors each representing a ward – North, South, East and Central.

This first elected body formulated a series of objectives under which Council was to operate. The objectives were based upon the provision of services in what is traditionally known as the 3Rs (Roads, Rubbish and Recreation) and on the principle of contracting out the provision of these services. The level of services under these functions were to be commensurate with a philosophy of low rates.

In 2008 Litchfield Shire removed Shire in its name due to the new Local Government Act 2008, which saw changes in the structure of local government across the Northern Territory.

In 2015 the entire Litchfield council and mayor Allan McKay was sacked by then NT Local Government Minister Bess Price amid allegations of bullying, misuse of funds and budget blow-outs. Allan McKay while serving as mayor had previously received a no-entry order and had been banned from council property after being accused of harassing council staff and fellow councilors.

In the subsequent election in November 2015, former local primary school principal Maree Bredhauer was elected as Mayor out of a field of eight candidates.

Consistent with its legislative requirements under the Local Government Act 2008, Council undertook an electoral review in May/June 2020, with a formal recommendation put forward to the Minister for Local Government, Housing and Community Development, for the Litchfield Council area to be divided into three (3) wards, North, South, and Central. These new boundaries came into effect on 16 July 2021.

A new Mayor, Doug Barden, was elected in the 2021 general election held in August.

Localities
Localities within the boundary of the Municipality include:

The majority of localities within the  Municipality were gazetted on 29 October 1997.  Herbert was gazetted on 15 July 1998 while Channel Island and Wickham were gazetted on 21 April 2004.  On 4 April 2007, the localities of Glyde Point, Gunn Point, Koolpinyah, Shoal Bay, Weddell and Wak Wak were created and the boundaries of the localities of Blackmore and Murrumujuk were amended.

Population

Council presidents
 John Maley (1985–1996)
 Gerry Wood (1996–2001)
 Mary Walshe (2001–2012)

Mayor
 Alan McKay (2012 – 2015)
 Maree Bredhauer (2015 - 2021)
 Doug Barden (September 2021 - current)

Council - current composition
Following the Northern Territory Local Government general election held on 28 August 2021, Northern Territory Electoral Commissioner, Mr Iain Loganathan, officially declared the 11th Litchfield Council on 13 September:

 Mayor - Doug Barden
 North Ward - Cr Rachael Wright, Cr Matthew Salter
 Central Ward - Cr Andrew Mackay, Cr Kev Harlan
 South Ward - Cr Emma Sharp, Cr Mark Sidey

Further information about Litchfield Council members (when available) can be found on the Council website: https://litchfield.nt.gov.au/your-council/elected-members

References

External links
Litchfield Council website
Litchfield Council History

 

Local government areas of the Northern Territory